Ferndale School District is a primary and secondary education school district located in Ferndale, Washington.  FSD serves over 5000 students (Oct, 2012)  in the city of Ferndale and surrounding areas including Custer, Lummi Island and north Bellingham.

The current Superintendent of Ferndale School District is Dr. Kristi Dominguez.

In September 2012, the Ferndale School District was named as one of 10 Signature Districts for Project RED, a nationwide education technology research group funded by Hewlett Packard, the Pearson Foundation, and SMART Technologies

Schools

High schools
Grades 9 - 12
Ferndale High School

Windward High School (closed in 2018)

Middle schools
Grades 6 - 8
Horizon Middle School
Vista Middle School

Primary schools
Grades K - 5
Beach Elementary School 
Cascadia Elementary School
Central Elementary School
Custer Elementary School
Eagleridge Elementary School
Mountain View Elementary School (closed in June 2013)
Skyline Elementary School

References

External links
Ferndale School District
Ferndale School District Report Card (2012-13)

School districts in Washington (state)
Education in Whatcom County, Washington